is a Japanese manga series written and illustrated by Seimu Yoshizaki. It follows the happenings which revolve around a small used manga store, specializing in old and obscure manga. A first series, tiled Kingyoya Koshoten Suitouchō, was published in Shōnen Gahōsha's Young King OURss special editions OURs Girl and OURs Lite from 2000 to 2002, with its chapters collected in two volumes. Kingyo Used Books was serialized in Shogakukan seinen manga magazine Monthly Ikki from 2004 to 2014, when the magazine ceased its publication. It was then published via compiled volumes, with the final volume released in 2020. The series is collected into seventeen tankōbon volumes. Kingyo Used Books was licensed in North America by Viz Media under their Viz Signature Ikki label.

Plot
The story revolves around a used manga store, and has a series of vignette-style chapters revolving around different characters. It extols the value of reading manga in one's life, and is notable for having references to several well-known, as well as obscure manga, from the smash-hit Dr. Slump, to the rarely heard-of Billy Puck.

Publication
Kingyo Used Books is written and illustrated by Seimu Yoshizaki. Yoshizaki first launched a series titled , which was published from 2000 to 2002 in Shōnen Gahōsha's Young King OURss special editions OURs Girl and OURs Lite. Two volumes were published on April 3 and June 26, 2003. Both volumes were re-released by Shogakukan on December 24, 2004. Kingyo Used Books was serialized in Shogakukan's seinen manga magazine Monthly Ikki from March 25, 2004 to September 25, 2014, when the magazine ceased publication. The series was then published via compiled volumes. The chapters were collected in seventeen tankōbon volumes, released from December 24, 2004 to July 30, 2020.

In North America, the series has been licensed by Viz Media for English language release and it debuted on Monthly Ikki'''s English website Sigikki on July 30, 2009. The first volume was released on April 20, 2010. As of October 18, 2011, only the first four volumes have been released.

Volume list

ReceptionKingyo Used Books'' was one of the Jury Recommended Works at the 16th Japan Media Arts Festival in 2012.

Carlo Santos in his Anime News Network column "Right Turn Only" gave the manga a grade of "B", saying that "if you want to get a non-manga fan into manga, this is probably not the manga to give them." The critic went on to say, "Kingyo is, if anything, too fixated on giving history lessons, trying to drown the reader in footnotes and details rather than letting the series speak for itself."

References

External links
 Official website at Ikki 
 

2004 manga
Bookstores in fiction
Comedy anime and manga
Manga creation in anime and manga
Seinen manga
Shogakukan manga
Shōjo manga
Shōnen Gahōsha manga
Slice of life anime and manga
Viz Media manga